Brookesia bekolosy also known as the Bekolosy leaf chameleon is a species of chameleon that is endemic to Madagascar. It was described by Raxworthy and Nussbaum in 1995. The International Union for Conservation of Nature classed the species as Endangered, and in 1992 the  single specimen of it was recorded.

Description and habitat
Brookesia bekolosy has only been collected once, being a single specimen from Bekolosy in the Manongarivo Special Reserve (Manongarivo Reserve) in the region of Diana in 1992. The species is believed to only be found at the Bekolosy Plateau, although further information is unknown.

Taxonomy
Brookesia bekolosy was first described by Raxworthy and Nussbaum in 1995. Necas recorded the species as Brookesia bekolosy in 1999: 276. According to the ITIS (ITIS), the taxonomic status of the Brookesia bekolosy is valid, as of 2012.

References

Reptiles described in 1995
Brookesia
Taxa named by Christopher John Raxworthy
Taxa named by Ronald Archie Nussbaum